Branxton can refer to:

Branxton, New South Wales, Australia
Branxton, Northumberland, England